Feldkirchen bei Mattighofen is a municipality in the Braunau am Inn district in the Austrian state of Upper Austria. It is home to the Berglandmilch dairy, the largest cheese dairy in Austria.

Geography
The municipality has an area of 34.6 km². About 23 percent of the municipality is forest and 70 percent farmland.

Settlements

 Aich 
 Altheim 
 Aschau 
 Außerpirach 
 Bamberg 
 Burgkirchen 
 Edt 
 Emerding 
 Feldkirchen bei Mattighofen 
 Gerberling 
 Gietzing 
 Gstaig 
 Hafenberg 
 Haiderthal 
 Hansried 
 Haselpfaffing 
 Hennergraben 
 Holz 
 Höslrein 
 Innerpirach
 Jetzing 
 Kampern 
 Kendling 
 Klöpfing 
 Oichten 
 Öppelhausen 
 Ottenhausen
 Otterfing 
 Primsing 
 Quick 
 Renzlhausen 
 Revier Renzlhausen 
 Sattlern 
 Sperledt  
 Vormoos  
 Wenigaschau  
 Wexling  
 Wiesing  
 Willersdorf

Notable people
 Franz Wasner (1905−1992), director and conductor of the Trapp Family Singers.

References

Cities and towns in Braunau am Inn District